The 2007 Women's EuroHockey Nations Championship was the 8th edition of the women's field hockey championship organised by the European Hockey Federation. It was held in Manchester, England from August 18 to August 25, 2007.

In the final, Germany upset Netherlands to clinch the first title. Meanwhile, England secured the last automatic berth for 2008 Summer Olympics after defeated Spain in third place match.

Squads

Results
All times are Central European Summer Time (UTC +2)

Preliminary round

Pool A

Pool B

Classification round

Fifth to eighth place classification
The teams who finished third and fourth in their respective pools are carried to this pool. They have to play two matches in this pool with the opponents they had not met while carrying the results for their matches against the played opponents.

The team finishing at the top of this pool classified as the fifth-place winner.

Pool C

First to fourth place classification

Semi-finals

Third and fourth place

Final

Awards

Statistics

Final standings

Goalscorers

References

External links
Official website

 
Women's EuroHockey Nations Championship
EuroHockey Nations Championship
EuroHockey Nations Championship
International sports competitions in Manchester
International women's field hockey competitions hosted by England
EuroHockey Nations Championship
Women 1
EuroHockey Nations Championship
Field hockey at the Summer Olympics – Women's European qualification
2000s in Manchester